Viral Scandal is a 2021 Philippine television drama series broadcast by Kapamilya Channel. Directed by Dado C. Lumibao and Froy Allan Leonardo, it stars Charlie Dizon, Jake Cuenca, Dimples Romana. The series premiered on Kapamilya Channel's Primetime Bida evening block, A2Z and TV5, and worldwide via The Filipino Channel on November 15, 2021, to May 13, 2022, replacing  Huwag Kang Mangamba and was replaced by 2 Good 2 Be True.

Premise
The lives of a simple family become disrupted when a scandalous video involving their eldest daughter goes viral.

Cast and characters

Main cast
 Charlie Dizon as Architect Rica "Ikay" M. Sicat / Rica M. Ramones – A junior architect at Balai Arkitektura. She is Kakay's oldest child, Dan's step-daughter, and Bea & Nico's older half-sister. Her biological father is Mayor Troy Ramones, and this illegitimate parent-child relationship results in her and her mother becoming targets of scrutiny in Sidero. A video of her being raped by Jigs goes viral, and throughout the series she fights with the trauma from that incident in order to come back strong, as well as to achieve justice for what happened to not only herself, but to other victims of rape.
 Jake Cuenca as Mayor Troy Ramones – The mayor of Sidero who chose to continue a relationship with Kakay despite his family's plans for him to marry Audrey. He is the biological father of Rica and Raven, and Audrey's husband. As the adoptive son of Alberto Ramones, he clashes with his family's decisions, especially those that affect Rica and her family. Due to constant manipulation even after winning his political position, he was unable to stop his father's acts of corruption. In the end, he resigned as the mayor and opens his own hotel franchise.
 Dimples Romana as Karla "Kakay" Meneses-Sicat – A former OFW in Dubai, Dan's wife, and mother to Rica, Bea, and Nico. She rushes back home, after finding out what happened to Rica, to become a housewife while selling clothing and accessories online. Known infamously in Sidero as Troy's mistress, she left him due to the guilt of hurting Audrey as a result of loving Troy and bearing his child. Kakay later on meets Dan after Rica was born as she restarts her life anew.
 Joshua Garcia as Architect Kyle Constantino – Founder and CEO of Balai Arkitektura who is traumatized by witnessing his father's sudden death, and later on becomes determined to find answers leading up to it. He first meets Rica after saving her from an attempt to take her own life.
 Miko Raval as Danilo "Dan" Sicat – A furniture maker and part-time food delivery driver, Kakay's husband, father to Nico & Bea, and step-father to Rica. He holds a grudge against the Ramones family for the pain they cause to his family.

Supporting cast
 Markus Paterson as Councilor Diego "Jigs" S. Ramones – The councilor of Sidero who harbors a history of rape behind his façade of a kind-hearted political figure. Bobby's son and Alberto's grandson. In order to prove himself to his friends, he decides to go after Rica after the latter previously rejected him during a retreat. Jigs eventually admitted to all his crimes.
 Jameson Blake as Architect Axel Mateo – A senior architect at Balai Arkitektura, and Kyle's long time best friend. He witnessed what happened to Kyle's father while they were in their college years.
 Maxene Magalona as Audrey Ramones – Troy's wife and Raven's mother. Has felt insecure due to her husband's affair with Kakay, and wastes no time to show how much she despises her, going as far as humiliating the Sicat family through defamation via her connections with the community and troll farms.
 Ria Atayde as Atty. Laura Dizon – A Sidero lawyer with a notable success rate who handles Rica's case, and Troy's friend.
 Jong Cuenco as Cong. Alberto Ramones – The congressman of Sidero who is determined to maintain his family's positive reputation, even if it means covering up for his grandson's crimes via corruption through his political connections. Bobby's biological father, and Troy's adoptive father. He suffered a stroke after reacting to Jigs confessing his actions, then is taken care of by Troy.
 Gian Magdangal as Bobby Ramones† – Alberto's biological son, Troy's adoptive brother, and Jigs’ father. He is in the shadows of his family's political reign due to his failure to keep up with the legacy early on. Has a history of domestic violence against his former wife and Jigs’ mother, causing the woman to leave him and his son. He later killed himself by jumping off the same building where Philip Constantino fell to his death.
 Louise Abuel as Nico M. Sicat – A student at Sidero University, and the youngest child of the Sicat family. He is a gamer who helps out on his family's endeavors to obtain justice for Rica.
 Karina Bautista as Beatriz "Bea" M. Sicat - A student at Sidero University, and the middle child of the Sicat family. In the Ang Kulit Ng Pag-ibig spin off, it is revealed that she had a crush on Pogs first, but eventually gives him the cold shoulder as he was oblivious of her feelings at the time. She idolizes Raven as the latter became her inspiration to boost her self-confidence.
 Aljon Mendoza as Leopoldo "Pogs" Ygot - A student at Sidero University and Bea’s classmate. He is Nico’s friend who has a crush on Bea. In the Ang Kulit Ng Pag-ibig spin off, he does not notice Bea romantically until their high school junior prom.
 Kaila Estrada as Raven Ramones - An interior designer and influencer, Troy and Audrey’s daughter, and Rica's half sister. Has a history of alcoholism to the point where she gets sent to rehab twice. Under influence by Audrey, she is threatened by Rica for being her father’s illegitimate daughter, as well as for getting Kyle’s attention. Raven defends her cousin Jigs against the allegations, but eventually opens her eyes to the truth after knowing her close friend was also a victim and doing her own investigation. She convinces Jigs to confess in order to make up for the pain she and Audrey inflicted onto Rica and her family. 
 Arielle Roces as Rose Tantoco - The secretary of Balai Arkitektura who was the initial victim of Jigs' rape scandal before Rica interfered.
 Aya Fernandez as Ella Montecillo - Archie's girlfriend who is diagnosed with breast cancer, she was another rape victim of Jigs.
 Vance Larena as Archie Soliman - Ella's boyfriend, and a friend of Jigs who knows about his secret.

Angel Locsin and Bianca Gonzalez make cameo appearances as themselves via fictitious social media posts, in which both call out the Philippine Department of Justice for not granting the appeal to dismiss rape cases.

Production
The project was first announced in February 2021. Filming for the drama began in late May 2021 with a lock-in taping set-up.

Initially known as Viral, it was later changed to Viral Scandal in October 2021.

Timeslot
Viral Scandal replaced Huwag Kang Mangamba on November 15, 2021, in a later timeslot at 9:30 PM. ABS-CBN decided to adjust Marry Me, Marry You's timeslot at 8:45 PM.

The show ended on May 13, 2022, with a total of 127 episodes and was replaced by 2 Good 2 Be True, but the schedule time is 8:45 PM, while The Broken Marriage Vow took over Viral Scandal's timeslot.

Spin-off
It was announced on March 9, 2022, that a spin-off was being teased during a virtual charity event in collaboration with drama anthology show Maalaala Mo Kaya. Dubbed as Ang Kulit ng Pag-Ibig, it focuses on the "hidden chapter" of Pogs and Bea, portrayed by cast members Aljon Mendoza and Karina Bautista respectively. Directed by Raz de la Torre, it released on March 16, 2022, on the ABS-CBN Entertainment YouTube channel.

References

ABS-CBN drama series
2021 Philippine television series debuts
2022 Philippine television series endings
Philippine crime television series
Philippine thriller television series
Philippine mystery television series
Television shows set in the Philippines
Filipino-language television shows
Fraud in television
Identity theft in popular culture
Television series about social media
Television series about bullying